The current series of vehicle registration plates in Kenya are on a white plate with black lettering and look quite similar to UK suffix style registrations. The format is LLL NNNL, where ‘L’ denotes a letter and ‘N’ denotes a digit. The older series of number plates were black with white or silver lettering. Later in the older series the front plates were reflective white with black lettering and the rear plates were reflective yellow with black lettering. According to Kenya National Bureau of Statistics there are over 1,626,380 vehicles in Kenyan road as at 2011.

1920-1989

It is not known when the first vehicle was registered in Kenya, but it is thought to be before 1920. Single letters were attributed to each of the 14 registration districts i.e. N=Kiambu, E=Kisumu, J=Kitale, B, H, T, W=Nairobi, A=Mombasa, C=Nakuru, D=Kericho, F=Eldoret, G=Nyeri, K=Muranga (Fort Hall), L=Kisii, Q=Machakos, S=Lamu, V=Isiolo, Y=Nanyuki.   A serial number of 1-999 followed, on white on black plates, save for public transport vehicles, ie buses, taxis and hire cars, which used black on white.

The 1950 K-prefix series was a change to a three-letter numbering system, necessitated by the increasing number of vehicles being registered. It was introduced on a regional basis as follow;
All plates began with K, followed by the regional code (below) and a serial letter A-Z, not using letters I or O.

Nairobi - KB (1950), KF (1955), KG (1959), KH (1961), KK (1965), KM (1968), KN (1970), KP (1972), KQ (1974), KR (1976) and KV (1978)
Mombasa - KA (1950), KJ (1966), KT (1977)
Nakuru - KC (1950), KL (1967), KS (1977)
Kisumu - KD (1950), KU (1977)
Nanyuki - KE
Other number were issued
Some KC and KL numbers were issued to Eldoret and Kitale.
KBA was issued to Nyeri, the first Nairobi number being KBB. Nyeri then followed with KFE and KGT.
Kericho was issued with KDB then KDK which were used up to 1969.
Kisii was issued with KDE then shared KDK with Kericho.
Kakamega used KDL between 1962 and 1967.

The numbering system was centralised in 1980 and after that date all Kenya numbers are in sequence. Between 1980 and 1984 the unused numbers from Nakuru (KS), Mombasa (KT) and Kisumu (KU) were issued, KW (1984) being the first number that was never used regionally.

1989-2007
After the registration of vehicle KZZ 999, the second generation was started in 1989. The series follow KAA 001A to KAZ 999Z The present KAA xxx A series had, the advantage being that each third letter of the number provided for 23,976 registrations instead of the previous 999. Hence for the series to be finished about 575424 vehicle will be registered. KAF, KAO, KAI were omitted.

2007-2014

After the registration of vehicle KAZ 999Z, the third generation was started in 2007 as KBA 001A. The series  ran from KBA 001A to KBZ 999Z

In 2014, the government announced a revamp of the registration plates to a new look, featuring electronic chips

2014-2020

After the registration of vehicle KBZ 999Z, the fourth generation was started in 2014 as KCA 001A. The series ran from KCA 001A to KCZ 999Z

2020-Present

After the registration of vehicle KCZ 999Z, the fifth generation was started in September 2020 with KDA 001A. The series will run from KDA 001A to KDZ 999Z. 

A new look of the Vehicle registration Plates was launched in August 2022. These new plates incorporate microchip technology, various anti-counterfeit features and a FE-Schrift font. The plates also include an imprinted Kenyan Flag, a hologram, watermark and a serial number linked to the vehicle chassis number.

Special plates

There are other number sequences that are used in Kenya.

The Kenyan Government uses GK;
The Kenyan County Governments use CG, for example Nairobi County vehicles are 47 CG;
Governors use GVN followed by their county code;
The Speaker of National Assembly uses SNA;
The Speaker of the Senate uses SS;
The Chief Justice uses CJ;
Kenya Army - KA;   
Kenya Air Force -  KAF;
Kenya Navy - KN;
Kenya Agricultural Institute - KAI;
Diplomats use N CD  and they are red plates with white letters and numbers;
Parastatals use blue plates with white letters and numbers
Motorcycles now use KMCA series;
Heavy Machinery uses "KHMA" series;
Tricycle uses KTWC series.
NGO - KX;
Vehicle Dealers Number plate series - KG. The plates have green background with white letters.

Diplomatic and United Nations codes
The diplomatic number given to the embassies were assigned in the order that they recognized Kenya’s independence, with Germany (then West Germany) as the first country to recognize Kenya's independence having the diplomatic plate 1 CD.

As of 2008, the diplomatic / UN sequence assignation was as below:  

1 CD - Germany

2 CD - Russian Federation

3 CD - Ethiopia

4 CD - China

5 CD - Norway

6 CD - Hungary

7 CD - Egypt

8 CD - Serbia

9 CD - Italy

10 CD - France

11 CD - Slovakia

12 CD - Denmark

13 CD - Japan

14 CD - Sudan

15 CD - Austria

16 CD - India

17 CD - Australia

18 CD - Canada

19 CD - Holy See (The Vatican)

20 CD - Finland

21 CD - Switzerland

22 CD - Britain

23 CD - Liberia

24 CD - Israel

25 CD - Nigeria

26 CD - Ghana

27 CD - Netherlands

28 CD - Malawi

29 CD - USA

30 CD - Belgium

31 CD - Sweden

32 CD - Pakistan

33 CD - Poland

34 CD - Korea

35 CD - Bulgaria

36 CD - Greece

37 CD - Cuba

38 CD - Kuwait

39 CD - Spain

40 UN - United Nations Development Programme (UNDP)

41 UN - World Health Organization (WHO)

42 UN - United Nations Educational, Scientific and Cultural Organization (UNESCO)

43 UN - International Bank for Reconstruction and Development (The World Bank)

44 UN - Food and Agriculture Organization of the United Nations (FAO)

45 UN - World Food Programme (WFP)

45 CD - Romania

46 CD - Thailand

47 CD - The African Union (A.U)

48 CD - Colombia

49 CD - India

50 CD - Somalia

51 CD - Brazil

52 CD - Turkey

53 CD - Lesotho

54 CD - Zambia

55 CD - Madagascar

56 CD - Malaysia

57 CD - D.R. Congo (DRC)

58 CD - eSwatini

59 CD - Sri Lanka

60 CD - Iraq

61 CD - Rwanda

62 UN - United Nations High Commissioner for Refugees / UN Refugee Agency (UNHCR)

63 UN - United Nations Children's Fund (UNICEF) Eastern & Southern African Regional Office

64 CD - Iran

65 CD - Cyprus

66 CD - Argentina

67 UN - United Nations Information Centre (UNIC)

68 CD - Philippines

69 CD - Burundi

70 CD - Chile

71 CD - Oman

72 CD - League of Arab States / Arab League

73 CD - European Union

74 CD - Yemen

75 CD - Kenya Mission to UNEP

76 CD - Côte d'Ivoire  (Consulate)

77 CD - Bangladesh

78 CD - Saudi Arabia

79 UN - United Nations Office for Project Services / (UNOPS)

80 CD - Libya

81 CD - Ireland (Consulate)

82 CD - United Nations Centre for Human Settlements / UN-Habitat (Kenya Mission)

83 CD - Algeria

84 CD - Palestine

85 CD - Uganda

86 CD - Mexico

87 CD - Morocco

88 CD - Costa Rica (Consulate)

89 CD - Gabon (Consulate)

90 UN - United Nations Children's Fund (UNICEF) Kenya Country Office (Unused)

91 CD - Indonesia

92 CD - Portugal

93 CD - Venezuela

94 CD - Zimbabwe

95 CD - International Civil Aviation Organization (I.C.A.O)

96 CD - Asian Development Bank

97 CD - Tanzania

99 CD - Peru

100 CD - International Finance Corporation (I.F.C)

101 CD - United Nations Environment Programme (UNEP) Norwegian Mission

102 CD - Mozambique

103 CD - South Africa

104 CD - Eritrea

105 UN - United Nations Office in Nairobi (UNON)

106 CD - Czech Republic

107 CD - The Aga Khan

108 UN - UNFPA

110 UN - UNIDO (United Nations Industrial Development Organization) 

112 UN - International Fund for Agricultural Development (IFAD)

113 UN - United Nations Office for Project Services (UNOPS)

115 CD - Ukraine

116 CD - Sahrawi

117 CD - Djibouti

118 CD - Sierra Leone

121 CD - South Sudan

123 CD - United Arab Emirates

References

External links 

Kenya
Kenya transport-related lists
 Registration plates